Blackpool South railway station serves the suburban south of the popular seaside resort of Blackpool, Lancashire, England. It lies only a short walk from Blackpool Football Club's stadium at Bloomfield Road. The station is managed by Northern Trains, who operate all trains serving it.

History

The station was originally called Waterloo Road when it opened in 1903, at the junction with a newly built express Marton Line direct from Kirkham. The platforms on the coastal "Fylde" line were opened on 14 July 1916 and replaced . It now had four platforms  (two for each line at the junction) and soon became a busy station. There were extensive sidings to accommodate the many excursion trains which came to Blackpool.

Until November 1964, the line extended north from here to Blackpool Central. The Marton Line closed to regular traffic in 1965; its track bed is now the road called Yeadon Way and the M55 motorway.

The station continued to handle through trains from Manchester, Liverpool and London until 1970, when these were all diverted to Blackpool North at the other end of town. It was then reduced to local status only, although it kept its signal box, two working platform faces and double track until 1982. The box was notable in that it was located on the opposite side of Waterloo Road bridge from the station and so could not see the tracks & platforms it controlled, instead being surrounded by the disused railway land once occupied by the main line & aforementioned sidings.  After the line was singled north of St Annes and the box was abolished, all trains used the former northbound platform and continue to do so to the present day.  The substantial main buildings (booking office and waiting rooms) that formerly existed at street level were demolished in 1985.

For much of the 1970s and early 1980s nearly all services terminated at Kirkham, where passengers were forced to change if wanting to travel further east but from 1988 they were integrated with those on the East Lancashire Line, a timetable pattern that remained in place 7 days a week until May 2018.

Facilities
The station is unstaffed and only has basic amenities, namely a waiting shelter and bench seating. A touch screen ticket vending machine and timetable poster boards are available on the platform, with a payphone at the street-level station entrance.  Train running information is provided via a digital CIS display and automated announcements.  Step-free access is available via ramps from Waterloo Road and the car park. A regular bus service can be caught to Halfway House or Victoria hospital on the number 5 and to Blackpool town Centre on the numbers 11 and 68. The 68 also heads to Preston, whilst the 11 goes to Lytham and St. Anne's on The Sea

Services
The typical off-peak service from the station is:
1tph (train per hour) to 

Monday - Friday the trains on the line do a Blackpool South - Preston - Colne - Ormskirk - Blackpool South circuit.  Sundays services run every two hours and continue through to Colne.

References

External links

Railway stations in Blackpool
DfT Category F1 stations
Former Preston and Wyre Joint Railway stations
Railway stations in Great Britain opened in 1903
Northern franchise railway stations